Ch'ŏllima is a kuyŏk in Namp'o Special City, North Korea.  Prior to 2004, it was Ch'ŏllima-kuyok, a district of northeastern Namp'o Directly Governed City.  Following the demotion of Namp'o in 2004, Ch'ŏllima became an independent county.  The region was part of Kangsŏ county in 1952, and was entered into Taean city; when Taean was demoted to county in 1983, it became part of Namp'o Special City.

Administrative divisions
Ch'ŏllima-guyŏk is divided into 17 tong (neighbourhoods) and 1 ri (village):

Economy
There are numerous ironworks and related factories in Ch'ŏllima.  The metalworking industry became active in the area during the period of Japanese rule in the early 20th century.

Transportation
Ch'ŏllima stretches along the Taedong River, which provides a convenient route for transportation by ground and water.  Frequent ferries connect the county to P'yŏngyang and Songrim.  The Youth Hero Motorway also passes through the county, as does the P'yŏngnam line of the Korean State Railway.

Military
It is the location of the Kangson enrichment site.

See also
List of secondary subdivisions of North Korea
Geography of North Korea
South Pyongan
Chollima Movement

References

Further reading

Districts of Nampo